Zlatná na Ostrove is a village and municipality in the Komárno District in the Nitra Region of south-west Slovakia.

Geography 
The village lies at an altitude of 120 metres and covers an area of 35.407 km².
It has a population of about 2555 people.

History 
In the 9th century, the territory of Zlatná na Ostrove became part of the Kingdom of Hungary. In historical records the village was first mentioned in 1267.
After the Austro-Hungarian army disintegrated in November 1918, Czechoslovak troops occupied the area, later acknowledged internationally by the Treaty of Trianon. Between 1938 and 1945 Zlatná na Ostrove once more  became part of Miklós Horthy's Hungary through the First Vienna Award. From 1945 until the Velvet Divorce, it was part of Czechoslovakia. Since then it has been part of Slovakia.

Ethnicity 
The village is about 91% Hungarian, 8% Slovak with minorities.

Facilities 
The village has a public library and a football pitch.

Villages and municipalities in the Komárno District
Hungarian communities in Slovakia